Patrick O'Reilly (6 April 1906 – 19 February 1994) was an Irish politician. A farmer by profession, he was elected to Dáil Éireann at the 1943 general election as a Clann na Talmhan Teachta Dála (TD) for the Cavan constituency and was re-elected at the 1944 general election. He did not contest the 1948 general election. 

He was elected as a Fine Gael TD for Cavan at the 1951, 1954, 1957 and 1961 general elections. He lost his Dáil seat at the 1965 general election but was elected to the 11th Seanad on the Agricultural Panel. He was re-elected to the Dáil at the 1969 general election but lost his seat at the 1973 general election.

References

1906 births
1994 deaths
Fine Gael TDs
Clann na Talmhan TDs
Members of the 11th Dáil
Members of the 12th Dáil
Members of the 14th Dáil
Members of the 15th Dáil
Members of the 16th Dáil
Members of the 17th Dáil
Members of the 11th Seanad
Members of the 19th Dáil
Politicians from County Cavan
Irish farmers
Fine Gael senators